Dina Ellermann (née Dina Radha'a; born 20 December 1980) is an Estonian dressage rider. She competed at the 2014 World Equestrian Games, and at three European Dressage Championships (in 2015, 2017 and 2019). She competed at the Tokyo 2020 Olympic Games, becoming the first Estonian equestrian to do so, and finished 49th individually.

Ellermann was born in Baghdad, Iraq to an Estonian mother and an Iraqi father. She graduated from secondary education from Tallinn 21st School in 2000 and in 2005 from Tallinn University, majoring in recreation management. She began training in equestrian sports the age of 11. 

Ellermann has been the Estonian national champion 9 times (2012–20) and the Estonian interior champion 6 times (2008, 2016–20). She has been a member of the Estonian national team since 2008. Her current best international championship result is 49th place from the 2017 European Championships.

References

External links
 

Living people
1980 births
Sportspeople from Baghdad
Estonian female equestrians
Estonian dressage riders
Equestrians at the 2020 Summer Olympics
Olympic equestrians of Estonia
Tallinn University alumni
Estonian people of Iraqi descent